The Woxna mine is one of the largest graphite mines in Sweden and in the world. The mine is located in the center of the country in Gävleborg County. The mine has estimated reserves of 6.93 million tonnes of ore 8.82% graphite.

References 

Graphite mines in Sweden